The La Quinta Formation is a Jurassic geologic formation which crops out in the Cordillera de Mérida and Serranía del Perijá of western Venezuela and northeastern Colombia. The formation is also present in the subsurface of the Cesar-Ranchería and Maracaibo Basins. At its type locality near La Grita, Táchira, it consists of a basal dacitic tuff followed by interlayered sandstones, tuffs, siltstones and rare limestones. Dinosaur remains including Laquintasaura, Tachiraptor, and Perijasaurus are among the fossils that have been recovered from the formation.

U–Pb zircon analysis demonstrates that the formation dates to 200.91+0.55 Ma at its base and a maximum age of 174.8 Ma.

Paleofauna

Regional correlations

See also 
 List of dinosaur-bearing rock formations
 List of stratigraphic units with few dinosaur genera

Notes

References

Bibliography 
 
 Barrett, P. M., R. J. Butler, S. C. Moore-Fay, F. E. Novas, J. M. Moody, J. M. Clark, and M. R. Sänchez-Villagra. ‘Dinosaur Remains from the La Quinta Formation (Lower or Middle Jurassic) of the Venezuelan Andes’. Paläontologische Zeitschrift 82, no. 2 (2008): 163–177.
 Weishampel, David B.; Dodson, Peter; and Osmólska, Halszka (eds.): The Dinosauria, 2nd, Berkeley: University of California Press. 861 pp. .

Maps 
 
 
 
 
 
 

Geologic formations of Colombia
Geologic formations of Venezuela
Jurassic System of South America
Early Jurassic South America
Jurassic Colombia
Jurassic Venezuela
Hettangian Stage
Sandstone formations
Conglomerate formations
Tuff formations
Fossiliferous stratigraphic units of South America
Paleontology in Venezuela
Formations
Formations
Formations
Geography of Zulia
Colombia–Venezuela border